Hendrick "Hank" Petrusma (born 26 December 1942) is a former Australian politician. Dutch-born, he was an independent member of the Tasmanian Legislative Council from 1982 to 1992, representing Hobart. He resigned in 1992 to run for the House of Assembly in Denison, but was defeated.

References

1942 births
Living people
Members of the Tasmanian Legislative Council
Independent members of the Parliament of Tasmania
Politicians from Hobart
Place of birth missing (living people)
Dutch emigrants to Australia